Tionne Tenese Watkins (born April 26, 1970), better known by her stage name T-Boz, is an American singer and actress. Born in Des Moines, Iowa, Watkins rose to fame in the early 1990s as a member of the girl-group TLC. She has won four Grammy Awards for her work with TLC.

Early life 
Tionne Watkins was born in Des Moines, Iowa, on April 26, 1970,  to James and Gayle Watkins. She has written that she is of African American, Native American and Irish descent. Watkins' family moved from Des Moines to Atlanta, Georgia, when she was nine years old.

Career

TLC 

Crystal Jones held auditions for a singing group and chose Watkins, and Lisa Lopes. The group eventually attracted the attention of Perri "Pebbles" Reid and her husband, Antonio "L.A." Reid, head of LaFace Records. Jones was replaced with Rozonda Thomas and the group was signed in 1991 as TLC. In order to preserve the TLC name, Watkins is now named "T-Boz", while Lopes became "Left Eye" and Thomas became "Chilli". The successful group sold more than 65 million records. T-Boz has won four Grammy Awards as a member of TLC. Since Lopes' death in 2002, T-Boz and Chilli have performed as a duo.

In late 2011, VH1 announced plans to produce a biopic on the group. Watkins and Thomas signed on as producers. The film, CrazySexyCool: The TLC Story, premiered October 21, 2013. The role of Watkins was portrayed by actress/singer Drew Sidora. Watkins' daughter, Chase, portrayed a younger Tionne in the film.

Solo work 
In addition to her work with TLC, Watkins recorded solo singles, including: "Touch Myself" (for the soundtrack of the 1996 film Fled) and "My Getaway" (for the soundtrack to the 2000 film Rugrats in Paris: The Movie). In addition, she has been a featured vocalist on such songs as: "Ghetto Love" with Da Brat, "Changes" with Society of Soul, "He Say She Say" with Keith Sweat, "Different Times" with Raphael Saadiq and "Be Somebody" with Paula Cole. She also featured on the song "It's Good" by YoungBloodZ. On January 22, 2013, Watkins released her first solo single in over 15 years titled "Champion". The song was released digitally, and proceeds went to help raise awareness for people suffering from blood conditions such as Sickle Cell. On September 6, 2017, Watkins released her latest single digitally from her audiobook "A Sick Life" titled "Dreams".

Television and film 
Watkins has worked as an actress, appearing in Hype Williams' 1998 film Belly. She also appeared in two episodes of Living Single, the first time guest-starring along with her bandmates and another time without them. Watkins served as one of the executive producers for the 2006 movie ATL featuring the rapper, T.I. She also appeared on The Real Housewives of Atlanta as a friend of Kandi Burruss. Watkins made a guest appearance as Pam Grier in one episode of the Adult Swim series Black Dynamite. In 2009, Watkins was a participant in the eight season of The Apprentice, finishing in 11th place. Watkins' reality TV show Totally T-Boz, premiered January 1, 2013, on the TLC network, and ran four episodes. The show chronicled Watkins' quest to create a solo album, reunite with bandmember, Chilli, and her life with her daughter Chase.

In 2016, Watkins and Chili joined actress Zoe Saldana onstage for her second round performance of "No Scrubs" on Spike's Lip Sync Battle against actor Zachary Quinto. In November 2016, she began a two-month acting stint as Sheila, a hardened prison inmate, on Days of Our Lives. Watkins would later return to Days of Our Lives as a recurring character, playing the zany ex-con Sheila, in both 2017 and 2018. In 2017, she lent her voice to a character in Trolland, also known as Trollz, a direct-to-DVD CGI-animated movie.

Other work 
Watkins published a book of semi-autobiographical poetry called Thoughts on November 3, 1999. In 2005, Watkins and stylist Tara Brivic (who would later appear regularly on Totally T-Boz) opened a children's boutique called Chase's Closet (named after her daughter). It was shut down years later. TLC also released a soundtrack album 20 marking both the band's 20-plus year legacy in entertainment business and the release of their biopic, this album included a new track written by singer Ne-Yo, "Meant to Be". They also had guest vocals on J. Cole's track "Crooked Smile". TLC celebrated their return with a series of highly publicized performances which included 2 dates: VH1's Mixtape Festival in Hershey, Pennsylvania, on July 27, 2013, and Drake's OVO Fest in Toronto on August 5, 2013. They released an album, TLC, on June 30, 2017.

Personal life 
As a child, Watkins was diagnosed with sickle cell anemia. Since the age of seven, she has been in and out of the hospital due to the painful condition. T-Boz opened up to the  public about the disease in 1996; she later became one of the spokespersons for Sickle Cell Disease Association of America. In 2002, she was hospitalized for four months due to a flare-up of sickle-cell anemia. She is a national co-chair of the progressive organization Health Care Voter.

On August 19, 2000, Watkins married rapper Mack 10. The couple's daughter, Chase Anela Rolison, was born premature a few months later on October 20, 2000. In June 2004, she filed for divorce, and requested a restraining order against Mack 10. In 2012, Watkins moved with Chase from Atlanta to Los Angeles, California, in order for Chase to be closer to her father.

In October 2009, Watkins revealed that she had secretly battled a potentially fatal brain tumor for three years. In March 2006, she was diagnosed as having a grape-sized acoustic neuroma on her vestibular nerve that affected her balance, weight, hearing, sight, and facial movement. Many physicians refused to remove the tumor due to her sickle-cell-related complications, leaving her alternatives grim.  Ultimately, she underwent surgery at Cedars-Sinai Hospital in Los Angeles.

Watkins filed for bankruptcy in February 2011 and again in October 2011. In an episode of the Reelz TV series Broke & Famous, entertainment reporter Viviana Vigil stated Watkins spent $9,000 a month and owed $770,000 on her home with a reported monthly income of $11,000, while another reporter  Nina Parker cited Watkins's medical bills and brain tumor.

In June 2016, Watkins announced  that she had adopted a 10-month-old boy named Chance.

Publication

Discography

Singles

As lead artist

As featured artist

Guest appearances

Music videos

Filmography

Film

Television

References

External links 

 

1970 births
African-American Christians
American contraltos
African-American women singer-songwriters
American people of Irish descent
American people who self-identify as being of Native American descent
American contemporary R&B singers
Arista Records artists
Cash Money Records artists
Living people
Motown artists
Musicians from Des Moines, Iowa
Participants in American reality television series
Musicians from Atlanta
Writers from Des Moines, Iowa
People with sickle-cell disease
TLC (group) members
Actresses from Des Moines, Iowa
21st-century African-American women singers
20th-century American actresses
Actresses from Iowa
20th-century African-American women singers
The Apprentice (franchise) contestants
Singer-songwriters from Iowa